Nidhan Singh Gudhan was a communist activist, a central team member of Communist Party of India (Marxist-Leninist). He was tortured and then hanged by Khalistan movement extremists. At the time of his death, he was leading Kisan Sangharsh Samiti of Ropar district. He was the founding editor of the Journal Surkh Rekha. He also held the president-ship of Punjab Kisan Union.

Earlier Life and Activism

Death

During Punjab insurgency, Khalistan movement extremists kidnapped Nidhan Singh Gudhan. He was tortured as the extremists were trying to investigate the secrets of Communist Party of India (Marxist–Leninist) and about their revolutionary paper "Surkh Rekha". On refusing their demands, he was hanged to death.

References

See also
Arjan Singh Mastana
Baldev Singh Mann
Chanan Singh Dhoot
Darshan Singh Canadian
Deepak Dhawan
Jaimal Singh Padda
Pash
Professor Ravinder Singh Ravi
Sarvan Singh Cheema
Sumeet Preetlari
Punjab insurgency
Communist Party of India (Marxist-Leninist)

1980s deaths
Year of birth missing
Communist Party of India (Marxist) politicians from Punjab, India